The 24th Alberta Legislative Assembly was in session from April 14, 1997, to February 12, 2001, with the membership of the assembly determined by the results of the 1997 Alberta general election held on March 11, 1997. The Legislature officially resumed on April 14, 1997, and continued until the fifth session was prorogued and dissolved on February 12, 2001, prior to the 2001 Alberta general election on March 12, 2001.

Alberta's twenty-fourth government was controlled by the majority Progressive Conservative Association of Alberta, led by Premier Ralph Klein. The Official Opposition was led by Howard Sapers of the Liberal Party.  The Speaker was Ken Kowalski.

Party standings after the 24th General Election

Members elected
For complete electoral history, see individual districts

Note:
1 Pat Black later changed her last name to Nelson.

Standings changes since the 24th general election

May 11, 1998 Grant Mitchell, Edmonton McClung resigns.
June 17, 1998 Nancy MacBeth, Edmonton-McClung elected in a by-election.
July 1998 Gene Zwozdesky, Edmonton Mill Creek sits as an Independent.
August 1998 Gene Zwozdesky, Edmonton-Mill Creek joins the Progressive Conservative caucus.
November 15, 1999 Pamela Paul-Zobaric, Edmonton Castle Downs sits as an Independent.
February 2, 2000 Pam Barrett, Edmonton-Highlands resigns.
June 12, 2000 Brian Mason, Edmonton-Highlands elected in a by-election.
July 11, 2000 Stockwell Day, Red Deer-North resigns.
September 25, 2000 Mary Anne Jablonski, Red Deer-North elected in a by-election.
October 4, 2000 Sue Olsen, Edmonton-Norwood resigns to run in federal election.

References

Further reading

External links
Alberta Legislative Assembly
Legislative Assembly of Alberta Members Book
By-elections 1905 to present
 Source of election results

24